EnVision is an orbital mission to Venus being developed by the European Space Agency (ESA) that is planned to perform high-resolution radar mapping and atmospheric studies. EnVision is designed to help scientists understand the relationships between its geological activity and the atmosphere, and it would investigate why Venus and Earth took such different evolutionary paths. The probe was selected as the fifth medium mission (M5) of ESA's Cosmic Vision programme in June 2021, with launch planned for 2031. The mission will be conducted in collaboration with NASA, with the potential sharing of responsibilities currently under assessment.

Science goals 
EnVision will deliver new insights into geological history through complementary imagery, polarimetry, radiometry and spectroscopy of the surface coupled with subsurface sounding and gravity mapping; it will search for thermal, morphological, and gaseous signs of volcanic and other geological activity; and it will trace the fate of key volatile species from their sources and sinks at the surface through the clouds up to the mesosphere. Core science measurements include: high-resolution mapping of specific targets, surface change, geomorphology, topography, subsurface, thermal emission, D/H ratio, gravity, spin rate, and spin axis. The specific mission's goals are:
 Determine the level and nature of current activity
 Determine the sequence of geological events that generated its range of surface features
 Assess whether Venus once had oceans or was hospitable for life
 Understand the organising geodynamic framework that controls the release of internal heat over the history of the planet

The scientists who submitted the EnVision proposal in response to the call for proposals for the M5 mission of ESA's Cosmic Vision program are Richard Ghail of Royal Holloway, University of London, Colin Wilson, Department of Physics, University of Oxford, UK and Thomas Widemann, LESIA, Observatoire de Paris and Université de Versailles-Saint-Quentin (France).

Science payload 
EnVision is an ESA mission in collaboration with NASA, and contributions from individual ESA member states for the provision of payload elements. NASA is contributing the VenSAR instrument and supplies DSN support. The other payload instruments are contributed by ESA member states, with ASI, DLR, BelSPO, and CNES leading the procurement of SRS, VenSpec-M, VenSpec-H and VenSpec-U instruments respectively.

 Venus Synthetic Aperture Radar (VenSAR), which will operate at 3.2 GHz in the S-band (9.4 cm wavelength). VenSAR will provide several imaging and ranging techniques from a polar orbit: (1) regional and targeted surface mapping, (2) global topography and altimetry, (3) stereo imaging, (4) surface radiometry and scatterometry, (5) surface polarimetry, (6) repeat pass interferometry opportunities. The Jet Propulsion Laboratory's S-band synthetic-aperture radar (VenSAR) selected by NASA is currently undergoing scientific, technical and mission assessment. A SAR is a versatile remote sensing technology that has unique capabilities for determining geophysical information often not available by other remote sensing methods. VenSAR will characterise structural, and geomorphic evidence of multi-scale processes that shaped the geological history of Venus, as well as characterise current volcanic, tectonic, and sedimentary activity. The principal investigator of the Venus Synthetic Aperture Radar is Scott Hensley, Jet Propulsion Laboratory NASA/California Institute of Technology.
 Venus Subsurface Radar Sounder (SRS), which will be a fixed dipole antenna operating in the range 9–30 MHz. SRS will search for subsurface material boundaries in various geological terrains that include impact craters and their infilling, buried craters, tesserae and their edges, plains, lava flows and their edges, and tectonic features in order to provide stratigraphic relationships at various depth ranges and horizontal scales. The principal investigator of the Subsurface Radar Sounder is Lorenzo Bruzzone, Università di Trento, Italy.
 Venus Spectroscopy Suite (VenSpec), which will consist of three channels: VenSpec-M, VenSpec-H and VenSpec-U. VenSpec-M will provide compositional data on rock types, VenSpec-H will perform extremely high resolution atmospheric measurements, and VenSpec-U will monitor sulphured minor species (mainly SO and SO2), as well as the mysterious UV absorber in the Venusian upper clouds. This suite will search for temporal variations in surface temperatures and tropospheric concentrations of volcanic gases, indicative of volcanic eruptions. The principal investigator of the Venus Spectroscopy suite and PI of VenSpec-M is Jörn Helbert, DLR Institute of Planetary Research, Berlin, Germany. The PI of VenSpec-H is Ann Carine Vandaele, Royal Belgian Institute for Space Aeronomy (BIRA/IASB), Belgium. The PI of VenSpec-U is Emmanuel Marcq, LATMOS, IPSL, France.

Radio Science Experiment 
Any orbiting spacecraft is sensitive to the local gravity field, plus the gravity field of the Sun and, to a minor extent, other planets. These gravitational perturbations generate spacecraft orbital velocity perturbations, from which the gravity field of a planet can be determined. EnVision'''s low-eccentricity, near-polar and relatively low altitude orbit offers the opportunity to obtain a high-resolution gravity field at each longitude and latitude of the Venusian globe. The analysis of the gravity field together with the topography gives insights on the lithospheric and crustal structure, allowing to better understand Venus's geological evolution. In the absence of seismic data, the measurements of the tidal deformation and proper motion of the planet provide the way to probe its deep internal structure (size and state of the core). The tidal deformation can be measured in the EnVision orbital velocity perturbations through the gravitational potential variations it generates (k2 tidal Love number).

The co-Principal Investigators of EnVision Radio Science and Gravity experiment are Caroline Dumoulin, LPG, Université de Nantes, France, and Pascal Rosenblatt, LPG, Université de Nantes, France.

 See also 

 Akatsuki, an operational Japanese Venus orbiter
 Magellan, a NASA Venus orbiter
 Mapping of Venus
 Observations and explorations of Venus
 Venus Express'', an ESA Venus orbiter
 NASA Discovery Program missions 15 and 16, both of which are going to Venus in the same timeframe:
 VERITAS, a radar mapping orbiter
 DAVINCI, a descent probe
 Volcanism on Venus

References

External links 
 Official site
 EnVision Assessment Study Report, publication date: 18 February 2021. Copyright: ESA.
 EnVision deployment video, produced by VR2Planets, Creative Commons Attribution license (reuse allowed)

Cosmic Vision
Missions to Venus
Orbiters (space probe)
Proposed spacecraft
European Space Agency space probes